Corepressor interacting with RBPJ 1 is a protein that in humans is encoded by the CIR1 gene.

Interactions 

CIR (gene) has been shown to interact with SNW1.

Model organisms
Model organisms have been used in the study of CIR1 function. A conditional knockout mouse line called Cir1tm3a(KOMP)Wtsi was generated at the Wellcome Trust Sanger Institute. Male and female animals underwent a standardized phenotypic screen to determine the effects of deletion. Additional screens performed:  - In-depth immunological phenotyping - in-depth bone and cartilage phenotyping

References

External links

Further reading